The Department of Highways and Minor Ports of state of Tamil Nadu is one of the Department of Government of Tamil Nadu

History 
 The Government of Tamil Nadu created a separate Highways Department as early as 1946 as sub department to Public Works Department  
 A separate Highways Department  was formed in the Secretariat under the Secretary to Government, Department in 1996 by The Government of Tamil Nadu

Vision
The vision is the Department is to increase the capacity, connectivity, efficiency and safety of the Highways System so as to enable balanced socioeconomic development of all sections of the people and all regions of the State and to realize the need to ensure development of Ports and industrial growth of the State by developing all the minor and intermediate ports.

Objective
The basic objective of the Department is to formulate policies, laws, regulations and various programmes based on the needs of the society now and then,  for achieving the following goals of the Government in the field of Higher Education in Tamil Nadu:
 To establish and improve roads, highways and bridges for quality land transport 
 To establish and improve small ports for quality sea transport

Undertakings and bodies

Present Ministers for Highways and Minor Ports
 E. V. Velu

Former Ministers for Highways and Minor Ports
 2006–2011 Vellakoil Saminathan
2017-2021  Edappadi K.Palanisamy

See also
 Government of Tamil Nadu
 Tamil Nadu Government's Departments
 Ministry of Road Transport and Highways (India)
 Department of Finance (Kerala)

References

External links
  www.tn.gov.in/departments/highways.html (Official website of the Tamil Nadu Highways and Minor Ports Department)
  www.tnhighways.org  (Official website of the Tamil Nadu Highways Department)

Tamil Nadu state government departments
Transport in Tamil Nadu
Tamil Nadu